Ensar Albayrak (born 18 June 1998) is a German rapper.

Life and career
His family, of Kurdish descent, emigrated from Turkey to Germany when he was a child. Eno grew up in Wiesbaden. He began to study Civil engineering at RheinMain University in Wiesbaden before he became successful with music. Eno is signed to the label Alles oder Nix which belongs to the rapper Xatar. His first major success was the song "Wer macht Para?" (with Dardan). He reached the top of the German single charts with the singles "Roli Glitzer Glitzer" (with Capital Bra & Luciano) and "Ferrari" (with Mero).

Discography

Albums

Mixtapes

Singles

As lead artist

As featured artist

Other charted songs

References

German lyricists
German rappers
1998 births
Living people
People from Wiesbaden
People from Elazığ